Mesotrypa is a genus of bryozoans known from the Ordovician period, first described in 1893. Its colonies consist of low masses, wider than they are thick, made of superimposed layers, with small monticules on the surface of the colony.

References

Trepostomata
Animals described in 1893
Fossils of Estonia
Prehistoric bryozoan genera